The Satanic panic was a widespread moral panic in the United States in the 1980s, characterized by allegations of satanic ritual abuse.

Satanic panic may also refer to:
 Satanic panic (South Africa), the Satanic panic in South Africa
 Satanic Panic (film), a 2019 American horror comedy film
 Satanic Panic in the Attic, a 2004 album by the band Of Montreal
 Seven Inches of Satanic Panic, a 2019 album by the band Ghost